Frank Cole may refer to:

Frank Cole (basketball), British basketball player
Frank Cole (filmmaker) (1954–2000), Canadian documentary filmmaker
Frank Nelson Cole (1861–1926), American mathematician